Wade Hampton Lefler was a Major League Baseball player. He also played in one game as a right fielder. He was the first player to make the major leagues after attending Duke University.

His stint with the Braves lasted just a single plate appearance, in which he struck out while pinch hitting for pitcher Rube Marquard. After the game, he returned to the Panthers, where he played most of the rest of 1924, batting .370 with 14 home runs.

Wade Lavender Lefler returned to the majors with the Washington Senators on September 18. He appeared four more times as a pinch hitter, once pinch hitting for Walter Johnson. In those four opportunities, he hit safely three times, including two doubles. On September 30, he started his first game, playing right field and batting cleanup. In four at bats, he had two more hits, including another double. This turned out to be Lefler's last appearance in the majors, leaving him with a career batting average of .556, and a career slugging average of .889.

After his brief major league career, Lefler played one more season in the minor leagues with the Memphis Chickasaws before retiring. He went on to become an attorney, serving as the city attorney for Newton, North Carolina. He died in 1981 at the age of 84.

References

Sources

Major League Baseball outfielders
Boston Braves players
Washington Senators (1901–1960) players
Baltimore Orioles (IL) players
Augusta Tygers players
Newark Bears (IL) players
Worcester Panthers players
Memphis Chickasaws players
Baseball players from North Carolina
1896 births
1981 deaths
Duke Blue Devils baseball players
People from Cooleemee, North Carolina
People from Newton, North Carolina